A beta reader is a test reader of an unreleased work of literature or other writing (similar to beta testing in software), who gives feedback from the point of view of an average reader to the author. A beta reader provides advice and comments in the opinions of an average reader. This feedback can be used by the writer to fix remaining issues with plot, pacing, and consistency. The beta reader also serves as a sounding board to see if the book has had the intended intellectual and/or emotional impact on the target market.

Origin 
"Beta reader" is an English term originally borrowed from the information technology/software industry where beta testers try to identify problems in a piece of computer software before its release.

Differences from other roles 
A proofreader usually only looks at grammar and spelling and is a paid professional. A critique partner is a trained writer who "test reads" from the perspective of an author, unlike a beta reader who has less experience with writing, but much experience reading many genres of fiction, and non-fiction. A beta reader can also serve as an alpha reader when reading a book draft that is still without an ending or is completely unrevised. Typically, a beta reader reviews a draft that has gone through at least one revision. Alpha and beta readers must be well educated generally, with a good knowledge of current affairs. This enables them to read works in the current context, with regard to both world affairs and the target market that the work is aimed at. A sensitivity reader is a beta reader from a culture that the writer is not familiar with.

See also
 Beta tester
 Critique
 Literary criticism

References 

Literary criticism
Internet slang
Popular culture language